Georges Frédéric Doriot (September 24, 1899 – June 1987) was a French-American known for his prolific careers in military, academics, business and education.

An émigré from France, Doriot became a professor of Industrial Management at Harvard Business School and then director of the U.S. Army's Military Planning Division, Quartermaster General, during World War II, eventually being promoted to brigadier general.

In 1946, he founded American Research and Development Corporation, regarded as one of the world's two first venture capital firms, earning him the sobriquet "father of venture capitalism".

In 1957, he founded INSEAD, now one of the world's top business schools.

Biography

Youth, education and military service
Doriot was born in Paris, France in 1899, to Berthe Camille Baehler and Auguste Doriot, the pioneering motorist, racer, engineer, factory manager, dealer and car manufacturer (owner of D.F.P.). Doriot enlisted in the French army in 1920. He emigrated to America to earn an MBA and stayed on, becoming a professor at the Harvard Business School in 1926. He became a U.S. citizen in 1940 and the following year was commissioned a lieutenant colonel in the U.S. Army Quartermaster Corps. As Director of the Military Planning Division for the Quartermaster General, he worked on military research, development and planning, eventually being promoted to brigadier general.

Educator 

In 1930, Doriot co-founded the CPA - Centre de Perfectionnement aux Affaires - which became part of HEC Paris in 2002, then rebranded as the  HEC Paris executive MBA, de facto one of the oldest executive MBAs in the world.

In 1957, Doriot founded INSEAD, the world's top global graduate business school in France with a group of his former Harvard MBA students.

ARDC and the Father of Venture Capital
In 1946, Doriot returned to Harvard and the same year he founded American Research and Development Corporation (ARDC), one of the first two venture capital firms along with Ralph Flanders and Karl Compton (former president of MIT), to encourage private sector investments in businesses run by soldiers who were returning from World War II.  ARDC's significance was primarily that it was the first institutional private equity investment firm that accepted money from sources other than wealthy families although it had several notable investment successes as well.

ARDC is credited with the first major venture capital success story when its 1957 investment of $70,000 in Digital Equipment Corporation (DEC) would be valued at over $38 million after the company's initial public offering in 1968 (representing a return of over 500 times on its investment and an annualized rate of return of 101%).  Until his death, Doriot remained friends with Ken Olsen, Digital's founder.

ARDC continued investing until 1971 with the retirement of Doriot.  In 1972, Doriot merged ARDC with Textron after investing in over 150 companies.  For his role in the founding of ARDC Doriot is often referred to as the "father of venture capitalism".

Death 
Doriot died of lung cancer in 1987 in Boston, Massachusetts.

Legacy
The Doriot Climatic Chambers at the U.S. Army Soldier Systems Center, Natick, Massachusetts were named in his honor in 1994. (During his time in the US Army, Doriot had written and spoken about the need for an "Institute of Man" for the testing of soldiers and their equipment at environmental extremes. The DCCs are seen as a partial fulfillment of that vision.)

The Doriot School of Capital was created in his name by the so-called Zeitgeist University, Geneva, Switzerland and Mexico City, Mexico Campus in 2020. with the goal of educating leaders and building companies.

See also
History of private equity and venture capital
Private equity
Leveraged buyout

Archives and records
Georges F. Doriot research papers at Baker Library Special Collections, Harvard Business School
Georges F. Doriot American Research and Development papers at Baker Library Special Collections, Harvard Business School
Georges F. Doriot papers at Baker Library Special Collections, Harvard Business School

References

Further reading

George F. Doriot papers at Baker Library Special Collections, Harvard Business School

Harvard Business School alumni
American venture capitalists
1899 births
1987 deaths
Deaths from lung cancer
United States Army generals
Digital Equipment Corporation people
French emigrants to the United States
Businesspeople from Paris
United States Army personnel of World War II
Harvard Business School faculty